"We Belong" is a song recorded by American rock singer Pat Benatar, released through Legacy Music Group on October 16, 1984, as the lead single from her sixth studio album, Tropico (1984). The song written by songwriting duo Eric Lowen and Dan Navarro. It matched the success of "Love Is a Battlefield" on the Billboard Hot 100 singles chart in the United States, peaking at #5. It reached #3 on Billboard's Top Rock Tracks chart and #34 on the Adult Contemporary.

It was also successful in the United Kingdom, where it peaked at No. 22 in the charts, nearly matching the popularity of "Love Is a Battlefield" which is her most recognized song there. The song earned Benatar a Grammy nomination for Best Female Pop Vocal Performance alongside Linda Ronstadt, Tina Turner, Madonna, and Whitney Houston. It was awarded a Gold certification in Canada for sales in excess of 50,000 units.

The music video uses the 7-inch version of the song, which contains some additional vocals in the 4 bar introduction that are not present in the album version. Benatar discovered that she was pregnant during filming of the video, and gave birth to her first child, Haley Giraldo on February 16, 1985.

Reception
Cash Box magazine said "This first single taken from the Tropico album is a collage of eclectic-electric effects and a sensitive and mature vocal offering from Benatar. Definitely not the standard Benatar/Geraldo [sic] hard rock jam, 'We Belong' is an ode to love which shows a whole world of vocal and instrumental nuances that have not been explored before by the powerful vocalist and her husband-producer-guitarist Neil Geraldo [sic]. An excellent move forward which should open up new commercial doors for this already well-established team."

Track listings
7" Single
A. "We Belong" - 3:40
B. "Suburban King" - 1:57

12" Single (Europe)
A. "We Belong" - 3:40
B1. "We Live for Love" ('84 Re-Mix) - 3:55
B2. "Suburban King" - 1:57

Charts

Weekly charts

Year-end charts

Certifications

References

External links
 Lynn Carey Saylor video of "We Belong"
 C.R.I.A. singles certifications for Pat Benatar

Pat Benatar songs
1984 singles
Chrysalis Records singles
1984 songs
Songs written by Dan Navarro
Rock ballads
1980s ballads
Songs written by Eric Lowen
American soft rock songs